Karabağlar is a district of İzmir Province of Turkey. It is one of the metropolitan districts of İzmir. Karabağlar was turned into a district by the Cabinet of Turkey on 6 March 2008.

See also
Hatay, İzmir

References 

Neighbourhoods of İzmir
Districts of İzmir Province